Uzuntala, Azerbaijan may refer to:

Uzuntala, Qakh
Uzuntala, Zaqatala